The year 2010 was the second year in the history of BRACE, a mixed martial arts promotion based in Australia. In 2010 BRACE held 4 events.

Events list

BRACE 6

BACE 6 was an event held on November 13, 2010, at Townsville Entertainment Centre in Townsville, Australia

Results

BRACE 5

BACE 5 was an event held on August 14, 2010, at Broncos Leagues in Brisbane, Australia

Results

BRACE 4

BACE 4 was an event held on May 8, 2010, at Townsville Entertainment Centre in Townsville, Australia

Results

BRACE 3

BRACE 3 was an event held on January 16, 2010, at Jupiters Casino in Townsville, Australia

Results

References 

2010 in mixed martial arts
2010 in Australian sport
BRACE (mixed martial arts) events